The 1962–63 Yugoslav Ice Hockey League season was the 21st season of the Yugoslav Ice Hockey League, the top level of ice hockey in Yugoslavia. Eight teams participated in the league, and Jesenice have won the championship.

Regular season

External links
 Season on hrhockey

Yugo
Yugoslav Ice Hockey League seasons
1962–63 in Yugoslav ice hockey